Gures may refer to:
 Gurez, a region in Kashmir
 Güreş, Polatlı, a village in Ankara Province, Turkey
 Güreş, a Turkish surname
Doğan Güreş (1926–2014), Turkish general and politician
Nihal Güres (born 1962), Turkish artists
Nilbar Güreş (born 1977), Turkish artist based in Austria

See also 
 Gurez